
Jebsen may refer to:

People
Atle Jebsen (1935–2009), Norwegian businessperson and ship-owner
Finn Jebsen (born 1950), Norwegian businessperson
Gustav Adolf Jebsen (1884–1951), Norwegian industrialist
Johnny Jebsen (1917–1945), anti-Nazi German intelligence officer and British double agent
Jørg Tofte Jebsen (1888–1922), Norwegian physicist, discovered and published Birkhoff's theorem
Kristian Gerhard Jebsen (1927–2004), Norwegian ship-owner
Michael Jebsen (1835–1899), German ship owner and politician
Peter Jebsen (born 1824), Norwegian businessperson and politician
Sigurd Jebsen Grieg (1894–1973), Norwegian museologist and archeologist
Hans Michael Jebsen (born 1956), Hong Kong-based Danish businessperson and land owner

Businesses
Jebsen & Jessen (SEA), engineering, manufacturing and distribution company in Southeast Asia
Jebsen Group, marketing and distribution company based and headquartered in Hong Kong
Jebsen Wilson Euro Carriers, shortsea liner shipping company

Geography
Jebsen Point at the south side of Port Jebsen, Signy Island, in the South Orkney Islands
Jebsen Rocks, chain of rocks north of Jebsen Point, Signy Island, in the South Orkney Islands
Port Jebsen, cove immediately north of Jebsen Point, Signy Island, in the South Orkney Islands

See also
Jebsens
Jebsheim
Jeppesen
Jepsen